Hohhot railway station, or Huhehaote railway station is a railway station on the Jingbao Railway line. The station is located in Hohhot, Inner Mongolia, China. It is downtown, next to the Express Bus Station.

History
The station opened in April 1921, expanding the Jingbao Line from Zhangjiakou to Hohhot. The ceremony marking the opening of the line was held in May of the same year. The station was initially referred to by older names for Hohhot, including Suiyuan or Guisui. The name was changed to Hohhot Station in 1954. In 1959, work started on the western site of Hohhot Station. The western site went into use in 1965 and, in 1966, all goods trains were diverted here. It became common practice to refer to the main site as Hohhot Passenger Station.

In 1981, a formal paper was published by the Hohhot Rail Authority declaring that the station was a level one transit station.

Metro station
Line 2 of Hohhot Metro, which was opened on 1 October 2020, serves Hohhot railway station.

Development
A new station called Hohhot East railway station opened in 2008. Both stations service passenger trains, with Hohhot East services heading west to Yinchuan, Lanzhou, and Chengdu. Trains from Hohhot railway station continue to service the east, including Beijing, Shanghai, Guangzhou, Shenyang, and Wuhan. The trains from Hohhot East railway station also pass through the original Hohhot railway station.

See also

List of stations on Jingbao railway
Hohhot Metro

References

Railway stations in Inner Mongolia
Railway stations in China opened in 1921
Hohhot
Buildings and structures in Hohhot